The Xokleng or Aweikoma (sometimes called botocudos) are a Native American tribe of Brazil; their territory is located mainly in the state of Santa Catarina. They were one of the original inhabitants of Misiones Province in Argentina. They are also found on the Ibirama, Posto Velho, and Rio dos Pardos reservations.

Ethnic groups in Brazil
Indigenous peoples in Brazil